Anna Kosnyreva (born ) is a Russian female volleyball player. She was part of the Russia women's national volleyball team.

She participated in the 2004 FIVB Volleyball World Grand Prix. Russia finished in 7th place. In 2005, Kosnyreva was Russia's team captain at the under 20 World championship. At club level, Kosnyreva played for Uralochka, Russia in 2004.

References

Further reading
Profile at FIVB.org
Player Statistics
FIVB World Grand Prix Final Standings

Russian women's volleyball players
1986 births
Living people
Place of birth missing (living people)
20th-century Russian women
21st-century Russian women